Jean-Louis Sbille (14 March 1948) is a Belgian-French-speaking artist, radio and television producer, actor and writer.

Career
In the mid-70s, with the graphic designer and art director, Marc Borgers they created RUPTZ, an art video and performance group. From 1977 to 1981 he published the new wave art magazine Soldes Fins de Séries. He has published novels for youth, poetry, dramatic works and screenplays for television Ici Bla Bla.

He produces a lot of cultural, musical and youth radio and TV shows on RTBF, the French-speaking Belgian radio and television organization.

He works in Brussels with the Mexican  choreographer  José Besprosvany from 2003 to 2009 as dramatist.

He is a professor of media criticism to Haute Ecole Libre de Bruxelles Ilya Prigogine.

Filmography

Works

Poetry
 Flip Inégral  (Illustrated by André Lambotte) 1974.
 Faustine Surface (Photographs by Marc Borgers) 1976.
 Mamamama  (Illustrated by Michèle Baczynsky) 2012.

Albums and novels for youth
 The Castle That Had Hiccups  (Illustrated by Dominique Maes) 2000.
 La table, les trois chaises et le petit tabouret (illustrated by Dominique Maes) 2002.
 Les Camions De La Peur  2005.
 Golfo 2012.

Screenplays
 Le nid de l'aigle 2004
 Uncle Logic &...  2005
 Patatras et Vnudlaba  2007
 Monologue de Machine à Laver 2010
 Poings Perdus  2012

References

External links

 

1948 births
Belgian male film actors
Belgian writers in French
Belgian television producers
Belgian male voice actors
Living people
Belgian male television actors
21st-century Belgian male actors
20th-century Belgian male actors